AKJ may refer to:

Asahikawa Airport, Hokkaido, Japan (IATA code AKJ)
 Akhand Keertani Jatha, Sikh organization